HDC may refer to:

Computing
 Handle of Device Context, part of the GDI API
 High-Definition Coding, an audio compression codec
 ; Unix-like ATA device file

Organizations
 Halal Industry Development Corporation, Malaysia
 Health and Disability Commissioner, New Zealand
 Health Data Consortium, US
 Historic Districts Council, New York City, US
 Honeysuckle Development Corporation,  NSW, Australia
 HDC Hyundai Development Company, South Korea

Transportation
 Haldia Dock Complex, of the Port of Kolkata, India
 Hammond Northshore Regional Airport (FAA LID code), Louisiana, US
 Hill descent control system, of an automobile

Other uses
 Heavyweight Dub Champion, an American electronic music group
 Herräng Dance Camp, Sweden
 Histidine decarboxylase, an enzyme
 Holder in due course, a concept in commercial law
 Home Detention Curfew, in the UK